Talmage is an unincorporated community in central Duchesne County, Utah, United States.

Description

The community lies along the former Utah State Route 134 (1933-1969), and west of the current Utah State Route 87. Although Talmage is unincorporated, it has its own ZIP code of 84073.

History
The town was founded in 1907 and named Winn in 1912, but renamed in 1914 to honor Latter-day Saint leader James E. Talmage.

The Talmage Post Office, which was hosted in a small bedroom in the home of long-time postmaster Warner Nielsen, closed after his death in 2003.

Climate
According to the Köppen Climate Classification system, Talmage has a semi-arid climate, abbreviated "BSk" on climate maps.

See also

References

External links

Unincorporated communities in Duchesne County, Utah
Unincorporated communities in Utah
Populated places established in 1907